Vorë railway station was a train station in Vorë, Albania. The station was connected to Durrës and the capital Tirana and was once an important interchange, being the junction for services from Durrës and Tirana, now closed, as well as those from Shkodër in the north, also closed except between Shkodër and Lac. After many years of neglect, the station was demolished and all tracks were removed.

Gallery

See also
Durrës–Tiranë railway

References

Buildings and structures in Vorë
Railway stations in Albania
Railway stations opened in 1949